Albtal-Verkehrs-Gesellschaft ('Alb Valley Transport Company', AVG) is a company owned by the city of Karlsruhe that operates rail and bus services in the Karlsruhe area, southwest Germany.

It is a member of the Karlsruher Verkehrsverbund (KVV) transport association that manages a common public transport structure for Karlsruhe and its surrounding areas and a partner, with the Verkehrsbetriebe Karlsruhe (VBK) and Deutsche Bahn (DB), in the operation of the Karlsruhe Stadtbahn, the pioneering tram-train system that serves a larger area. It also operates some of the region’s bus services and carries freight by road and rail, and operates a travel agency.

It owns and maintains several railway lines, including the Albtalbahn railway, and leases and maintains other lines. VBK, a sister company, operates Karlsruhe's bus and tram network, and AVG Stadtbahn routes use VBK tracks to access the city centre. Besides AVG and VBK lines, AVG also operates on DB tracks and a short stretch of tram track belonging to the city of Heilbronn. VBK and DB Stadtbahn routes traverse AVG tracks.

AVG dates back to the acquisition in 1958 of the Albtalbahn railway by the city of Karlsruhe. Because it remained legally a railway and needed to conform to mainline railway design and safety standards, AVG accumulated experience in operating across the divide between tramway and railway. It was this experience that led to the development of the Stadtbahn Karlsruhe and to the AVG operating over a much wider area.

References

External links
 Home page of AVG 
 Albtal-Verkehrs-Gesellschaft in Stadtwiki Karlsruhe 
 privat-bahn.de: Fahrzeuge der AVG 
 BahnGalerie: Photos of the AVG 

Karlsruhe Stadtbahn
Tram transport in Germany
Rail transport in Karlsruhe
Companies based in Baden-Württemberg
Companies based in Karlsruhe